Ogbourne Priory was a priory in Wiltshire, England, from the 12th century until the early 15th.

There may have been a priory building in the 13th century, perhaps attached to the manor house at either Ogbourne St Andrew or Ogbourne St George; both manors belonged to the Benedictine order of Bec Abbey, Normandy. Later the priory existed only as a legal name for the administration of the Bec estates in England. The last Prior of Ogbourne, William de St. Vaast, died in 1404 or 1405 and the properties were dispersed.

Sources
 
 

Monasteries in Wiltshire
Alien priories in England
Order of Saint Benedict